Iasonion or Daphne was a town of ancient Thrace, inhabited during Roman and Byzantine times. 

Its site is located near Beşiktaş in European Turkey.

References

Populated places in ancient Thrace
Former populated places in Turkey
Roman towns and cities in Turkey
Populated places of the Byzantine Empire
History of Istanbul Province